Solariella kempi is a species of sea snail, a marine gastropod mollusk in the family Solariellidae.

Description
The size of the shell attains  12 mm.

Distribution
This marine species occurs in the Atlantic Ocean off Argentina and the Falkland Islands at depths between 50 m and 545 m.

References

 Powell, A. W. B. 1951. Antarctic and Subantarctic Mollusca: Pelecypoda and Gastropoda. Discovery Reports 26: 47-196, pls. 5-10

External links
 To Biodiversity Heritage Library (1 publication)
 To Encyclopedia of Life
 To World Register of Marine Species

kempi
Gastropods described in 1951